Siddharth College of Law was founded in Mumbai in 1956. It is run by the People's Education Society which was formed by Dr. Babasaheb Ambedkar on 8 July 1945. The college is affiliated to the University of Mumbai.  The college was formed with a vision to spread legal education amongst all sections of society. The college is housed at the Anand Bhavan which has been declared as a heritage structure by the Heritage society of the MMRDA.

Courses offered
Currently the college offers the three years LL.B. course. But, the five years B.S.L., LL.B course is also proposed. There are also Post Graduate Diploma and Certification courses being conducted by the college.

Library
The Library of the college is said to have a huge collection of books on law. The college is also home to some rare books from Dr. Ambedkar’s personal collection, which were used as reference for drafting the Constitution of India.

Visits and events
In the past the college has been visited by several personalities such as Mrs. Sirimavo Bandaranaike. The events hosted by the college have seen visits by Judges of the Bombay High Court like Justice P. B. Majumdar, Justice Roshan Dalvi and many other legal luminaries. 
The students of the college were allowed to attend the Mumbai terror attack trial of Qasab, which was otherwise restricted to the general public.

Notable people associated with the college
Dr. Babasaheb Ambedkar 
Justice R.A. Jahagirdar (High Court at Bombay)
M. C. Setalvad
Manohar Joshi 
Justice M. C. Chagla
Farooq Sheikh
Adv. K. P. Pawar (Court appointed defence lawyer for Mumbai terror trial)
Suresh Saraiya (Noted radio commentator on cricket)
Shantaram Naik
Prakash Yashwant Ambedkar, Politician

References

Law schools in Maharashtra
Universities and colleges in Mumbai
Affiliates of the University of Mumbai
Educational institutions established in 1956
1956 establishments in Bombay State
B. R. Ambedkar